St. Casimir's Roman Catholic Church is a historic Roman Catholic parish church located within the Archdiocese of Newark at 164 Nichols Street in the Ironbound section of Newark, Essex County, New Jersey, United States. The church was built in 1917 and added to the National Register of Historic Places in 1997.

See also 
 National Register of Historic Places listings in Essex County, New Jersey

References

Roman Catholic churches completed in 1917
20th-century Roman Catholic church buildings in the United States
Roman Catholic churches in New Jersey
Churches on the National Register of Historic Places in New Jersey
Renaissance Revival architecture in New Jersey
Roman Catholic churches in Newark, New Jersey
National Register of Historic Places in Newark, New Jersey
New Jersey Register of Historic Places